Les Eucalyptus is a suburb of the city of Algiers in northern Algeria.

Notable people

Suburbs of Algiers
Communes of Algiers Province
Algeria
Cities in Algeria